Lunn is a surname, and may refer to:

 Agnes Cathinka Wilhelmine Lunn (1850–1941), Danish artist
 Arnold Lunn (1888–1974), British mountaineer
 Billy Lunn (footballer) (1923–2000), Northern Ireland 
 Bob Lunn (born 1945), American golfer
 Brian Lunn (1893–1956), British writer
 David Lunn (born 1930), English bishop
 David Lunn-Rockliffe (1924–2011), British businessman
 Elizabeth Teter Lunn (1904–1998), American biologist
 Enoch Lunn, English footballer
 Fred Lunn (1895–1972), English footballer
 Gary Lunn (born 1957), Canadian politician
 George Lunn (UK politician) (1861–1939)
 George R. Lunn (1873–1948), American clergyman and politician
 Gladys Lunn (1908–1988), English athlete 
 Halvor Skramstad Lunn (born 1980), Norwegian snowboarder
 Harry Lunn, Canadian football player
 Henry Charles Lunn (1817-1894), editor of The Musical Times, 1863-1887
 Henry Simpson Lunn (1859–1939), English businessman
 Hugh Lunn (born 1941), Australian journalist
 Hugh Kingsmill, full name Hugh Kingsmill Lunn (1889–1949), British writer
 Janet Lunn (born 1928), Canadian juvenile writer
 Joanne Lunn, British singer
 John Lunn (born 1956), British composer
 John Robert Lunn (1831–1899), English organist and clergyman
 Joseph Lunn (1784–1863), English dramatist
 Karen Lunn (born 1966), Australian golfer
 Laurence Lunn (1896–1946), English footballer
 Louise Kirkby Lunn (1873–1930), English singer
 Maggie Lunn (1961–2017), English casting director
 Mardi Lunn (born 1968), Australian golfer
 Peter Lunn (1914–2011), British alpine skier
 Robert Lunn, American football player
 Roy Lunn (born 1925), automotive industry engineer
 Tommy Lunn (1883–1960), English footballer
 Trevor Lunn, politician in Northern Ireland
 Wilf Lunn (born 1942), English inventor and TV presenter
 William Lunn (1872–1942), British politician
 William Lunn (rugby player) (1926–1996), New Zealand rugby union player
Zachary Lunn (professional bear wrestler, angler, bruins fan, writer, and whiskey enthusiast)

See also
 Lunn Island, island of Papua New Guinea
 Sally Lunn bun, a type of large bun
 3208 Lunn, asteroid

 Chris Lunn , Team leader